The Ambassador and Permanent Representative of Canada to the United Nations, known unofficially as the Canadian Ambassador to the United Nations, is the Permanent Representative of Canada to the United Nations. The position was established in 1946 and is based at the Permanent Mission of Canada to the United Nations, which is located at 466 Lexington Avenue (20th floor) in New York City.

Permanent Missions of Canada

New York 
The Permanent Mission of Canada to the United Nations in New York City,  where the main headquarters of the United Nations is located, is responsible for the multilateral foreign policy priorities of Canada, facilitating Canada's interests in international development, peace, security and human rights.

Geneva 
The Permanent Mission of Canada to the World Trade Organization, the United Nations and the Conference on Disarmament in Geneva is the primary avenue for diplomatic relations between the Government of Canada and international organizations based in Geneva, Switzerland, mainly the World Trade Organization (WTO), the United Nations Office at Geneva (UNOG), the Conference on Disarmament and the World Intellectual Property Organization (WIPO).

Canada's Permanent Representative to the UN and the Conference on Disarmament in Geneva is Ambassador Leslie E. Norton. Canada's Permanent Representative to the WTO is Ambassador Stephen de Boer. In addition to local personnel, the mission is composed of staff from various Canadian federal departments and agencies.

List of Permanent Representatives

Chiefs of Delegation to the League of Nations 
Prior to 1946, Canada sent representatives, called 'Chiefs of Delegation', to the League of Nations. On three occasions, the Chief of Delegation was the Prime Minister of Canada:
 1928 – William Lyon Mackenzie King
 1934 – Richard Bedford Bennett
 1936 – William Lyon Mackenzie King

See also 
 List of Ambassadors and High Commissioners of Canada
 Mission of Canada to the European Union

References

United Nations
 
Canada
Global Affairs Canada